The 2002 Asian Junior Men's Volleyball Championship was held in Azadi Volleyball Hall, Tehran, Iran from 10 September to 17 September 2002.

Pools composition
The teams are seeded based on their final ranking at the 2000 Asian Junior Men's Volleyball Championship.

Preliminary round

Pool A

|}

|}

Pool B

|}

|}

Pool C

|}

|}

Pool D

|}

|}

Quarterfinals
 The results and the points of the matches between the same teams that were already played during the preliminary round shall be taken into account for the Quarterfinals.

Pool E

|}

|}

Pool F

|}

|}

Pool G

|}

|}

Pool H

|}

|}

Classification 13th–14th

|}

Classification 9th–12th

Semifinals

|}

11th place

|}

9th place

|}

Classification 5th–8th

Semifinals

|}

7th place

|}

7th place

|}

Final round

Semifinals

|}

3rd place

|}

Final

|}

Final standing

Team Roster
Rouhollah Kolivand, Davoud Moghbeli, Amin Moammeri, Mohsen Andalib, Saeid Mostafavand, Mehdi Mahdavi, Mahmoud Tavanaei, Mohammad Soleimani, Mikaeil Yolmeh, Vahid Sadeghi, Farhad Zarif, Behzad Behnejad
Head Coach: Mostafa Karkhaneh

Awards
MVP:  Rouhollah Kolivand
Best Spiker:  Yuan Xi
Best Blocker:  Davoud Moghbeli
Best Server:  Rouhollah Kolivand
Best Setter:  Behzad Behnejad
Best Receiver:  Farhad Zarif

External links
 www.jva.or.jp

A
V
Asian men's volleyball championships
International volleyball competitions hosted by Iran
Asian Junior